Laives is a town and a comune (municipality) in South Tyrol in northern Italy, located about  south of the city of Bolzano. It is one of only five mainly Italian speaking municipalities in South Tyrol, and the fourth largest municipality in the province.

Geography

Subdivisions
The municipality contains four urban centers:
Laives (Leifers)
Pineta (Steinmannwald)
San Giacomo (St. Jakob)
La Costa (Seit)

Laives is the seat of the town hall, Pineta and San Giacomo are two frazioni (hamlets), while La Costa is - according to the municipal statute - a località (inhabited locality), but it is often referred to as a frazione also in the official documentation. The Brantental valley connects it with Deutschnofen.

History

Coat-of-arms
The emblem consists of an argent pile, with concave sides on azure and a chapel on a mountain of gules. The sign, similar to that of the Counts of Lichtenstein who lived in the castle on Mount Köfele, represents the church of Peterköfele. The emblem was adopted in 1970.

Society

Linguistic distribution
According to the 2011 census, 71.50% of the population speak Italian, 27.99% German and 0.51% Ladin as first language.

Culture
The carnival of Laives is one of the most important carnivals of Trentino-South Tyrol. 

The city is also the headquarters of the Coro Monti Pallidi, an all-man a capella chorus founded in 1967 by Sergio Maccagnan and conducted since 2004  by Paolo Maccagnan.

Notable people 
 Reinhard Dallinger (born 1950 in Laives) a retired zoologist and Professor of zoology and ecotoxicology

References

External links
Official website 

Municipalities of South Tyrol